Love and Kisses may refer to:
 Hugs and kisses, also love and kisses
 Love and Kisses (film), a film released in 1965
 Love and Kisses (TV series), a 1955 British TV sitcom
 Love and Kisses (album), an album by Dannii Minogue
 Love and Kisses from Brotherhood of Man, a 1976 album by Brotherhood of Man, often referred to as simply Love and Kisses
 "Love and Kisses" (song), a song by Dannii Minogue
 Love & Kisses, a 1970s disco group